Yohan Rossel (born 13 February 1995) is a French rally driver. In 2021, he became the driver's champion in the WRC-3 category. Rossel is also the 2019 French Rally champion.

Results

WRC results

WRC-2 results

WRC-3 results

JWRC results

References

External links
 rally results profile

Living people
1995 births
French rally drivers
World Rally Championship drivers
Place of birth missing (living people)
Peugeot Sport drivers
Saintéloc Racing drivers
European Rally Championship drivers